NewsNow is a news aggregator service that was launched in 1997 with fewer than ten sources, it now links to thousands of publications including top news providers. NewsNow provides a service in which breaking news articles are matched against key-word topic specifications, the relevant links and publication names are then delivered to the user. 

Other than NewsNow's main website, which is freely accessible to the general public, the company provides customised news feeds for corporate subscribers. The site also offers access via mobile devices, and offers a version tailored for the Opera Mini application.

Interface
NewsNow uses a search function and a list of colour-coded, pre-built topics (or categories) to allow users to find desired content. The site also provides the option to search topics, and saves up to 10 of one's most-viewed topics. The site also offers a full-text searching service to subscribers (non-subscribers are limited to headline searches for words or phrases). News articles clicked on by users are displayed in a pop up window, or a new tab. If the user enters a particular category NewsNow gathers as many articles as possible on the category and then displays them in chronological order. Beside each news line, a flag icon is shown to represent the country of origin of the publication, which tells the reader at a glance from which part of the globe the news derives. Any user can highlight or hide all headlines of a particular news source by clicking on the name of the news provider.

Sources
NewsNow searches over 33,000 sources from all over the world in real time. NewsNow.co.uk adds approximately 100 new sources every day, which are located by a dedicated research team. It searches through articles in 20 different languages in 141 different countries. In contrast to more conventional news feeds, these sources include reputable blogs and electronic journals. Users are given the option to exclude blogs from newsfeeds if so desired. NewsNow does not host or create any of the supplied articles. It searches through all the major news providers, as well as blogs, scientific and electronic journals.

Ranking
NewsNow.co.uk is the 274th most visited website in the UK, and approximately 14.4% of all its users are from the UK. Moreover, the site is generally visited by over 11 million users monthly.

NewsNow has around 623,000 pages indexed by Google. It has a 20% market share making it the second largest news aggregation site on the internet second only to Google News. According to data from Hitwise, as of 22 August 2009, NewsNow accounted for almost 20% of visits to news aggregators in the UK.

Business model

Advertisement
NewsNow creates revenue from its many free users through advertisement. Adverts are displayed on all of the site's webpages, clearly visible to anyone who accesses the site.

Subscription Service
NewsNow's second source of income comes from a subscription service. For a monthly fee, organisations can have a tailored news-feed sent to them articles connected to keywords specified by the company. For example, a large company, such as IBM (one of NewsNow's subscribers) can have all articles with any reference to IBM sent directly to them. The service claims that articles will be sent to the customer within 15 minutes of the articles being published on the original site.
News feeds can be filtered based on sophisticated key-word (and exclusion) profiles including context of the chosen words.  News feeds are delivered to clients by email or by direct FTP or 'HTTP Push'.

Controversy
According to an open letter placed on its site, NewsNow has been threatened with potential legal action by several publishers, including News International, the publishers of The Times, The Sun and The News of the World. An open letter, written by Struan Bartlett, NewsNow's Managing Director and Chairman, claims that the publishers are threatening legal action over NewsNow's refusal to accept new controls over links to websites owned by these publishers. He responded to the comments from the News International with the following statement: "We deliver you traffic and drive you revenues you otherwise wouldn't have received. The idea that we are undermining your businesses is incorrect. It is fanciful to imagine that, if it weren't for link aggregators, you would have more traffic or revenues. We provide a service that you do not: a means for readers to find your content more readily, via continuously updating links to a diversity of websites."

There has also been interest from the UK's Newspaper Licensing Agency regarding the use of news headlines search results, which they consider to be copyrighted content.

References

News aggregators